Floating is the third album by the German rock band Eloy. It was released in 1974.

Track listing
All songs written by Eloy except where indicated.
Side One
 "Floating" – 4:02
 "The Light from Deep Darkness" – 14:40
Side Two
"Castle in the Air" – 7:16
 "Plastic Girl" – 9:11
 "Madhouse" (lyrics by Gordon Bennit) – 5:16

2001 Remastered Edition Bonus Tracks

"Future City" (live) – 4:59
 "Castle in the Air" (live) – 8:08
 "Flying High" (live) – 3:30

Personnel
Frank Bornemann — guitar, vocals
Manfred Wieczorke — organ, guitar
Luitjen Janssen — bass
Fritz Randow — drums
Produced by Eloy
Engineered by Wolfgang Thierbach and Helmut Rüßmann

References

External links

1974 albums
Eloy (band) albums
Harvest Records albums